Godley is a city in northwestern Johnson County, Texas, United States, in the Dallas–Fort Worth metroplex. It is on Texas State Highway 171, Farm Roads 2331 and 917, and the tracks of the Atchison, Topeka and Santa Fe Railway northwest of Cleburne. The population was 1,009 in 2010, up from 879 in 2000.

History
A station was constructed in 1886. By 1888, when the post office opened, Godley had a gristmill, three cotton gins, and two dairy-processing plants. Four years later it had two general stores. By the mid-1920s the population was 613. In 1930 it was 378, and twenty-two rated businesses operated locally. In the 1940s the town had a population of 317 and twenty businesses. By 1956 it had a population of 424 and sixteen businesses, and by 1990 it had 569 people and twelve businesses.

Geography

Godley is located at  (32.448427, –97.529520).

It lies near the headwaters of the Nolan River watershed, a tributary of the Brazos River.

Demographics

As of the census of 2000, there were 879 people, 296 households, and 235 families residing in the city. The population density was 523.7 people per square mile (202.0/km2). There were 313 housing units at an average density of 186.5/sq mi (71.9/km2). The racial makeup of the city was 94.43% White, 0.46% African American, 0.80% Native American, 2.73% from other races, and 1.59% from two or more races. Hispanic or Latino of any race were 10.13% of the population.

There were 296 households, out of which 45.3% had children under the age of 18 living with them, 61.1% were married couples living together, 13.2% had a female householder with no husband present, and 20.3% were non-families. 17.6% of all households were made up of individuals, and 8.8% had someone living alone who was 65 years of age or older. The average household size was 2.95 and the average family size was 3.34.

In the city, the population was spread out, with 32.5% under the age of 18, 9.1% from 18 to 24, 28.7% from 25 to 44, 20.4% from 45 to 64, and 9.3% who were 65 years of age or older. The median age was 31 years. For every 100 females, there were 84.7 males. For every 100 females age 18 and over, there were 88.3 males.

The median income for a household in the city was $40,667, and the median income for a family was $44,583. Males had a median income of $37,692 versus $23,571 for females. The per capita income for the city was $14,556. About 5.2% of families and 7.7% of the population were below the poverty line, including 6.9% of those under age 18 and 6.6% of those age 65 or over.

Education
Public education in the city is provided by the Godley Independent School District.

References

External links

City of Godley official website

Dallas–Fort Worth metroplex
Cities in Texas
Cities in Johnson County, Texas
Populated places established in 1886